Subway to the Country is the second album of American singer-songwriter David Ackles.

Track listing
All tracks composed by David Ackles

"Main Line Saloon"
"That's No Reason to Cry"
"Candy Man"
"Out on the Road"
"Cabin on the Mountain"
"Woman River"
"Inmates of the Institution"
"Subway to the Country"

Personnel
David Ackles – vocals
Lonnie Mack – guitar
Victor Feldman – percussion
Louie Shelton
Jim Gordon – drums
John Audino – horn
Gary Coleman – percussion
Don Gallucci
William Green – woodwind
Douglas Hastings – guitar
Jim Horn – saxophone
Larry Knechtel – bass
Gordon Marron – strings
Lew McCreary – horn
Ollie Mitchell
Fredric Myrow – arranger, conductor
Meyer "Mike" Rubin
Clifford Shank
Sheridon Stokes – flute
Tony Terran
Ray Triscari
William Ulyate
Craig Woodson
Technical
Bruce Botnick, Fritz Richmond - engineer
William S. Harvey - art direction, design
Frank Bez - cover photography

References

1970 albums
David Ackles albums
Elektra Records albums